Wiyŏn Ch'ŏngnyŏn station is a railway station in Wiyŏn-dong, greater Hyesan city, Ryanggang province, North Korea, on the Paektusan Ch'ŏngnyŏn Line of the Korean State Railway. It is also the starting point of the narrow-gauge Samjiyŏn line.

History
The station, along with the rest of the Pongdu-ri–Hyesanjin section, was opened by the Chosen Government Railway on 1 November 1937.

On 9 October 2006 an underground nuclear test was conducted at P'unggye-ri in Kilju County, causing the closure of the line for 3-4 months.

Services
There is a large sawmill here that processes logs shipped by rail from the Paengmu narrow-gauge line via Paegam, and processed lumber is shipped from here to other destinations. Passenger trains run along the Samjiyŏn line to meet with trains running between Hyesan and Kilju.

References

Railway stations in North Korea